Amblycheila hoversoni, also known as the South Texas giant tiger beetle, is a flightless and nocturnal tiger beetle species found in south and west-central Texas, United States. First described in 1990, it is the largest tiger beetle species in the Western Hemisphere.

References

Cicindelidae
Beetles of North America
Beetles described in 1990